The Perkiomen Valley School District (PVSD) is a school district based in central Montgomery County, Pennsylvania (US).  It serves the boroughs of Collegeville, Trappe, and Schwenksville, and the townships of Lower Frederick, Perkiomen, and Skippack, in Pennsylvania. The district headquarters are in Perkiomen Township.

The district's mascot is the Viking.

History
The Perkiomen Valley School District was formed in 1969 through the merger of the Perkiomen Joint School District and the Schwenksville Union School District. Perkiomen Joint School District was, itself, a consolidation of Collegeville, Trappe, and Skippack Township (served by the former Collegeville-Trappe High School), while Schwenksville Union School District had unified Schwenksville, Lower Frederick Township, and Perkiomen Township (served by the former Schwenksville High School). 
 
Its mascot and distinctive colors of orange and brown were elected by the students in the spring of 1969, after the merger was announced. (Collegeville-Trappe had the Colonel and colors of red and gold, and Schwenksville, the Bluebird, with blue and white.) Some alumni believe that the new mascot and colors were chosen by the administration – for some unexplained reason – without regard to the election results.

Perkiomen Valley High School, then housed in what had been the Collegeville-Trappe High School building, and the former Perkiomen Valley Junior High School, housed at the old Schwenksville High School, opened that fall. The current high school building, at 509 Gravel Pike (Pennsylvania Route 29), Graterford, Perkiomen Township (Collegeville postal address), opened in the fall of 1976.

The original superintendent was the late Dr. U. Berkley Ellis, Jr.

U.S. News & World Report, in its 2018 list of best high schools in the United States, ranked Perkiomen Valley High School the ninth best high school in Pennsylvania.

Schools
 Evergreen Elementary School
 Skippack Elementary School
 South Elementary School
 Schwenksville Elementary School
 Perkiomen Valley Middle School East
 Perkiomen Valley Middle School West 
 Perkiomen Valley High School

Notable alumni
 Jen Carfagno, meteorologist
 Daddy Long Legs, musician
 Joseph DeSimone, entrepreneur
 Bill Neill, American football player
 Jimmy Pop, musician
 John Smiley, baseball player
 Grant Wiley, American football player
 Branden Sisca, Pennsylvania State Trooper
 Steven Rich, Jounalist

References

External links
 

School districts in Montgomery County, Pennsylvania
1969 establishments in Pennsylvania
School districts established in 1969